Teaching (your) grandmother to suck eggs is an English language saying that refers to a person giving advice to another person in a subject with which the other person is already familiar (and probably more so than the first person).

Origins of the phrase
The origins of the phrase are not clear.  The Oxford English Dictionary and others suggest that it comes from a translation in 1707, by J. Stevens, of Francisco de Quevedo (Spanish author): "You would have me teach my Grandame to suck Eggs". A record from 1859 is available, implying common usage by that time.  Most likely the meaning of the idiom derives from the fact that before the advent of modern dentistry (and modern dental prostheses) many elderly people (grandparents) had very bad teeth, or no teeth, so that the simplest way for them to eat protein was to poke a pinhole in the shell of a raw egg and suck out the contents; therefore, a grandmother was usually already a practiced expert on sucking eggs and did not need anyone to show her how to do it.

Notable early uses
 The History of Tom Jones, a Foundling, Henry Fielding (1749):
 Letter from Percy Bysshe Shelley to Leigh Hunt, 15 August 1819: "But what am I about?  If my grandmother sucks eggs, was it I who taught her?"

Related phrase
The use of the phrase "Suck-egg" for "a silly person" is dated back to 1609 by the OED.

References

Metaphors referring to food and drink
English-language idioms